Duckworth  may refer to:

 Duckworth (surname), people with the surname Duckworth
 Duckworth (DuckTales), fictional butler from the television series DuckTales
 Duckworth Books, a British publishing house
 , a frigate
 Duckworth, West Virginia, an unincorporated community, United States
 an earlier name of Bluff, Queensland, Australia
 "Duckworth" (song) (stylized DUCKWORTH.), a 2017 song by Kendrick Lamar (named after his surname)
 Duckwrth, a stage name of Jared Lee
 Santiago J. Duckworth, was in the California State Assembly and a real estate developer

See also
 Duckworth-Lewis method, a statistical method for match calculations in cricket
 The Duckworth Lewis Method, an Irish pop group named after the cricketing term